The list of University of Toledo people includes notable alumni and faculty of the University of Toledo. The University of Toledo is a public university in Toledo, Ohio.

Alumni

Science

Medicine

Technology and innovation

Law and politics

Diplomats

Business

Journalism and news

Academics

Literature, art, and architecture

Music

Film and television

Athletics

Football

Basketball

Baseball

Track and field

Tennis

Wrestling

Winter sports

Faculty
 Laurie Dinnebeil, Distinguished University Professor, and Daso Herb Endowed Chair
 Clyde Summers (1918–2010), labor lawyer and law professor at the University of Pennsylvania Law School

College of Engineering 
 Glenn Lipscomb, department chair of Chemical and Environmental Engineering
 Nagi Naganathan, dean of College of Engineering

Heads of university

Notes and references

University of Toledo people